Clifton Court Forebay is a reservoir in the San Joaquin River Delta region of eastern Contra Costa County, California,  southwest of Stockton. The estuary region the forebay is located in is only 1m to 3m above mean sea level.

History 
The body of water was created in 1969 by inundating a  tract as part of the California State Water Project.

It serves as the intake point of the California Aqueduct for transport to Southern California, and feeds the Delta–Mendota Canal (a part of the Central Valley Project) to recharge San Joaquin Valley river systems.

Geological context 
If a large enough earthquake happens near or at the Clifton Court Forebay, the California water system for irrigation and municipal use will be adversely affected. Several earthquakes have nearly shut down the Forebay. The 2014 South Napa earthquake and the 1989 Loma Prieta earthquake came very close to shutting down the Forebay intake system.

The Clifton Forebay is a wetland system that drained nearby small rivers into the Pacific Ocean. Only in recent times was its freshwater drainage functions turned into a gateway to water storage.

The Central Valley region that this forebay interfaces with is very gradually filling in the central valley with sediments. The region may be rebounding from recent run ins with glaciations that affected North America.

In popular culture 
A documentary about the decline of the United States' infrastructure, The Crumbling of America, was commissioned by the U.S. A&E network in the late 2000s. The documentary is typically shown on the History television channel in the United States, although other educational broadcasters globally have shown it. It features the Clifton Court Forebay as a "strategic piece of California freshwater infrastructure" subject to shutdown for up to two years if struck by an earthquake of magnitude 7.5 or greater.

See also
 List of dams and reservoirs in California
 List of lakes in California

Related sites 
 Reservoir map
 History of the California Aqueduct system

References

California State Water Project
Reservoirs in Contra Costa County, California
Sacramento–San Joaquin River Delta
Infrastructure completed in 1969
1969 establishments in California
Reservoirs in Northern California